The Oakland County Sheriff's Office is the largest sheriff's department in the state of Michigan. The Sheriff's Office had 859 uniformed officers as of 2017, and has jurisdiction over all of Oakland County, with a population of 1.274 million as of the 2020 census. Roughly 343,000 residents of fifteen communities are served by the Sheriff's Office under contract.

The Sheriff's Office also includes a marine patrol and rescue unit, responsible for patrolling 450 lakes across the county.

Republican Michael Bouchard has served as the Oakland County Sheriff since 1999.

Headquarters 
The Oakland County Sheriff's Office is located at 1200 N Telegraph Road, Building 38 East in Pontiac, Michigan, the Oakland County seat.

Rank structure

Communities served
The Sheriff's Office patrols fifteen municipalities under contract. Each city and township has its own substation. 
 Addison Township (including the village of Leonard)
 Brandon Township (including the village of Ortonville)
Clarkston
 Commerce Township
 Highland Township
 Independence Township
 Lyon Township
 Oakland Township
 Orion Township
 Oxford Township
 Springfield Township
 Pontiac
 Rochester Hills
The Addison Township and Brandon Township substations are within the villages of Leonard and Ortonville respectively.

Specialized units
 SWAT
 Traffic
 K-9
 Aviation Unit operating a Eurocopter AS350 Écureuil
 Alcohol Enforcement Unit
 Crash Reconstruction Unit
 Marine and Parks Patrol Units
 Mounted Division
 Honor Guard
 Motorcycle Unit
 Reserves
 Cell Extraction Team

Notable incidents

Walled Lake family shooting 
On September 11 in Walled Lake, Michigan, a QAnon adherent named Igor Lanis shot his wife, one of his two daughters and the family dog following a heated argument. The wife and dog were killed and the daughter was hospitalized. Oakland County Sheriff's Officers and members of the Walled Lake Police Department shot and killed Lanis after he opened fire on them. The other daughter, Rebecca Lanis, was out of the house at the time and was not harmed. She told reporters that her father had once been kind but had become rude and unsociable after becoming obsessed with several QAnon-related conspiracy theories following the 2020 presidential election. Lanis posted about her experience to r/QAnonCasualties shortly after the shooting.

References

Oakland County, Michigan
Sheriffs' offices of Michigan
1820 establishments in Michigan Territory